Vega Baja is a town and municipality located on the coast of north central Puerto Rico. It is north of Morovis, east of Manatí, and west of Vega Alta. Vega Baja is spread over 14 barrios. The population of the municipality was 54,414 at the 2020 census. It is part of the San Juan–Caguas–Guaynabo metropolitan statistical area.

History
The name Vega Baja in Spanish means 'lower valley' (Vega Alta meaning 'upper valley'). Historians believe that the name Vega Baja comes from La Vega. Vega is a surname of one of the families involved in the foundation of Vega Baja. It is also believed that the name comes from the region of Spain La Vega Baja del Segura. Additionally, in Caribbean Spanish, a vega is also a tobacco plantation.

Although is generally believed that Vega Baja was founded in 1776, after the division of Vega Alta from La Vega (modern day Vega Alta) historians have verified that it was many years later when it was officially recognized by the Spanish government. The foundation day is October 7, and it is also the day of commemorating the Virgin of the Rosary. Vega Baja was originally known as Vega-baxa del Naranjal de Nuestra Señora del Rosario (Vega Baja of the Orange Grove of Our Lady of the Rosary).

Cibuco is one of the rivers that goes through Vega Baja, and is a variation of the name Sebuco, who was a chief or Cacique Taíno of the region. These small tribes of Taínos were known to settle in the vicinity of the rivers. Although the Cibuco River is prone to floods due to heavy seasonal rains, the benefits provided to the land by the river are numerous.

Taino rock carvings have been found on some of the exposed reefs in the vicinity of the Cibuco River. Among these carvings is one depicting a face and others shaped as fish. They are an indication that these reefs were frequented for spear fishing and perhaps other day-to-day activities. Other places like Carmelita, Maisabel, Cueva Maldita and Paso del Indio are known as archaeological sites where the aborigines established their communities.

Drug trafficking has been an issue in Vega Baja for many years and in early 1990, $43 million dollars in cash was found buried in plastic barrels, thought to have been deposited by drug smugglers for later retrieval. The sudden wealth of a few Vega Baja residents attracted attention and prompted an investigation by FBI and local police. By May 1990, the FBI had traced $11 million and seized and confiscated property and goods purchased with the money thought to belong to drug lord Ramon Torres Gonzalez.

On September 20, 2017 Hurricane Maria struck the island of Puerto Rico. With an area of about  Vega Baja is a municipality on the north coast with some barrios on the coast and others in more mountainous areas. With an estimated population of 53,674 (2016, Census estimates) when Hurricane Maria struck, 48.5% were below poverty and 21.8% were people over the age of 60. The hurricane triggered numerous landslides in the municipality. Rivers were breached causing flooding of low-lying areas, and infrastructure including homes were destroyed. A tributary of the Cibuco River rose immediately putting 100 people's lives at risk. Many of those residents took refuge on roofs or sought out small boats to navigate the flooded waters and to help remove people who were trapped on roofs or inside residences. Then municipal staff picked people up in buses and took them to the shelter at the Lino Padrón school, where the electric generator nor school cistern worked. Telecommunications systems were destroyed causing state and municipal rescue officers to have to rely on radio communication signals, which were limited to a radius of a few miles. Radio signals did not reach Vega Baja and news, such as the fact that a curfew had been declared, only spread by word of mouth. The mayor, who lost his home, said the storm surge and hurricane winds destroyed most of the structures in Cerro Gordo, a coastal sector. The urban, downtown areas were impassable due to the large number of downed trees and power lines. The Cibuco River roe above PR-2 highway, preventing the passage to the adjoining town/ municipality of Vega Alta and heading west, a stretch could be covered with extreme difficulty, until it was also blocked with the rising of the Río Grande de Manatí. The mayor stated, “We don't know what happened on the mountain. We have not been able to get there yet,” and “The destruction is so great. I don't know how to explain seeing the despair of a mother or an elderly person right now. It is not easy what we are living.”

Geography

Vega Baja is located on the northern coast. The municipality is located along the Northern Karst region of Puerto Rico, and the town is located on the Northern Plains.

Barrios

Like all municipalities of Puerto Rico, Vega Baja is subdivided into barrios. The municipal buildings, central square and large Catholic church are located in a barrio called  (barrio-pueblo on the US Census). Note: While the US Census and the PR GIS data, indicate there are 14 barrios in Vega Baja, the Vega Baja government page seems to exclude Vega Baja barrio-pueblo in its list of barrios.

Algarrobo
Almirante Norte
Almirante Sur
Cabo Caribe
Ceiba
Cibuco
Puerto Nuevo
Pugnado Adentro
Pugnado Afuera
Quebrada Arenas
Río Abajo
Río Arriba
Pueblo
Yeguada

Sectors
Barrios (which are like minor civil divisions) and subbarrios, in turn, are further subdivided into smaller local populated place areas/units called sectores (sectors in English). The types of sectores may vary, from normally sector to urbanización to reparto to barriada to residencial, among others.

Special Communities

 (Special Communities of Puerto Rico) are marginalized communities whose citizens are experiencing a certain amount of social exclusion. A map shows these communities occur in nearly every municipality of the commonwealth. Of the 742 places that were on the list in 2014, the following barrios, communities, sectors, or neighborhoods were in Vega Baja: Alto de Cuba, Callejón Pérez and Sector El Hoyo in Barrio Algarrobo, Guarico Viejo, and La Trocha-Río Abajo.

Demographics

Puerto Rico was ceded by Spain in the aftermath of the Spanish–American War under the terms of the Treaty of Paris of 1898 and became a territory of the United States. In 1899, the United States conducted its first census of Puerto Rico finding that the population of Vega Baja was 10,305.

Tourism

Landmarks and places of interest
There are 14 beaches in Vega Baja.
Some main attractions of Vega Baja include:

 Casa Alcaldía (the historic city hall)
 Casa Alonso Museum
 Casa Portela Museum
 Cibuco Swamp
 El Trece Recreational Area
 Vega Baja House of Culture and Tourism
 Man of the Sugar Cane Monument
 Melao Melao Artisan Center
 Migrants Square
 Museo del Salon de la Fama del Deporte Vega Baja Melao Melao
 Puerto Nuevo Beach and its recreational area
 José Francisco Náter Square (main town square or plaza)
 Teatro América
 Teatro Fénix
 Tortuguero Lagoon
Tortuguero Recreational Area
 Trinitarias Park

Economy

The abundant fertility of its soil has meant Vega Baja has much agricultural and farming land. In addition, Vega Baja has one of the most visited beaches of the northern coastline, Puerto Nuevo Beach (officially Mar Bella Beach). This beach attracts thousands of beachgoers annually, making it a center for local tourism, especially during the hot summer months. It boasts a natural rock formation of enormous proportions both in height and length colloquially named La Peña. This rock feature shelters the beach portion from the open seas just behind it. During rough marine conditions, the rock feature protects beachgoers, while the spectacle of waves crashing from behind and cascading down its face can be appreciated in the relative safety of the beach.

Agriculture
 Pineapple, cattle feed (hay). In decades past, the land portion situated between the neighborhood of Monte Carlo and the neighborhood of Los Naranjos, was the site for the cultivation of sugar cane.  
 Dairy farming

Industry
 Clothing, leather articles; electrical and electronic equipment, machinery
 Medical, and pharmaceutical.

Culture

Festivals and events
Vega Baja celebrates its patron saint festival in October. The  is a religious and cultural celebration that generally features parades, games, artisans, amusement rides, regional food, and live entertainment.

Other festivals and events celebrated in Vega Baja include:

 Three Kings Festival – January
 Triathlon – March
 Annual Tournament of Champions – June
 San Juan Night – June
 Virgen del Carmen Festival – July
 Beach Festival at Mar Bella} - July
 Socio-Cultural Fair – May
 Melao Melao Festival – October
 Christmas Festival – December

Government
Vega Baja, like all municipalities of Puerto Rico, elect a mayor every four years to administer the city. The educator Marcos Cruz Molina is the mayor since 2013 and Rafael “Piro” Martinez is the President of the Municipal Legislature.

The city belongs to the Puerto Rico Senatorial district III, which is represented by two senators. In 2012, José "Joito" Pérez and Ángel "Chayanne" Martínez were elected as District Senators. Rafael (Tatito) Hernández is the Eleventh District Representative and Hector Torres the Twelve District Representative at the House of Representatives of Puerto Rico.

Transportation
There are 23 bridges in Vega Baja.

Notable people
 Bad Bunny – Platinum rapper, singer, record producer, actor, and professional wrestler.
 Chicky Starr – Professional wrestler and manager in the World Wrestling Council (WWC) and the International Wrestling Association (IWA)
 Ivan Rodriguez – a.k.a. “Pudge” was widely considered the best catcher of his generation, MLB AL MVP, perineal all star and gold glover. Hall of Fame baseball player who played mostly for the Texas Rangers
 Juan Gonzalez – Two time AL MVP, 3 time Allstar, Multiple time AL HR leader, Home run derby winner, MLB RBI leader and in 1998 he was owner of the second most RBIs by all star break ever (101). He played mostly for the Texas Rangers.

Symbols
The  has an official flag and coat of arms.

Flag
Vega Baja's flag consists of a yellow cloth crossed by a green band. The band relates to the fertile valley and the river.

Coat of arms
The Vega Baja coat of arms has a v-shaped green band with overlapping roses in silver and three oranges trees, with gold fruit. At the top part is a five-tower crown, silver, black and green. The main colors of the shield; green and gold are used traditionally in civic, scholastic and sports activities. The crown five tower indicates that the town holds the rank of "Villa" by royal decree.

Anthem
The anthem of Vega Baja is "A Vega Baja" with lyrics as written in 1974 by Adrián Santos Tirado and music by Roberto Sierra.

Education

The following schools are in Vega Baja:

 Agapito Rosario Rosario Grades: K - 5
 Angel Sandin Martinez Grades: 6 - 8
 Centro De Adiestramiento 
 Juan Quirindongo Morell (Superior) Grades: 9 - 12
 Lino Padro Rivera Grades: 9 - 12
 Manuel Martinez Davila Grades: K - 8
 Nueva Brigida Alvarez Rodriguez Grades: K - 12
 Rafael Hernandez Grades: K - 5
 San Vicente Grades: K - 5
 Su Almirante Norte Grades: Pre-K - 8

Higher education
 Caribbean University-Vega Baja Private Not-for-profit 4-year or above

Private schools
 Mech-Tech College

Gallery

See also

 List of Puerto Ricans
 History of Puerto Rico
 Did you know-Puerto Rico?

References

Further reading

External links

 Enciclopedia Vegabajena
 Official Municipal Government Website
 Archivo del Diario Vegabajeño de Puerto Rico Segunda Etapa de Diciembre 2012 a Octubre 2016
 (sin título)
 U.S. Census Bureau QuickFacts: Vega Baja Municipio, Puerto Rico
 Vega Baja Municipality on Facebook

 
Municipalities of Puerto Rico